Aghyohil (Irish: Achadh Eochill) is a townland in the parish of Desertserges, County Cork, Ireland. The area is home to Aghyohil National School and Agyhohil GAA club

The village of Ahiohill lies within the parish.

References

Townlands of County Cork